"I Want to Come Home for Christmas" is a holiday song recorded by Marvin Gaye in 1972. The song was co-written by Gaye and Forest Hairston and was released  on a posthumous Marvin compilation titled, The Marvin Gaye Collection 18 years later.

Overview

Recording
The idea of the song came to Forest Hairston after seeing pictures of people tying yellow ribbons around trees for Vietnam War troops who were forced to be prisoners of war or P.O.W. Hairston hadn't finished writing the song when Marvin Gaye, who he had become friends with, happened to stop by his house. When Gaye asked Hairston what he was working on, he said he was "messing with a song" in tribute to the Vietnam troops. Gaye had mentioned to Hairston that he wanted to have a holiday song of his own and asked Hairston to play him a bit of it. Gaye stopped him mid-track and began to work more on the track with him, adding in melody and harmony parts.

Gaye later took Hairston's track and went to the Motown Recording Studios in Los Angeles, otherwise known as Hitsville West, and produced the track himself. Gaye finished the recording in one take and after it was recorded on tape, returned to Hairston's apartment and slipped the tape in Hairston's recorder. When Hairston heard it, he immediately hugged Gaye complimenting his talents, to which Gaye laughed.

Issues with Motown and later releases
The song was supposed to be part of a Christmas-themed album by Gaye, and was given the Tamla number T-323L and scheduled for release in late 1972. But the album was never released. Gaye struggled to get the song released as a single for Vietnam troops with Motown. Eighteen years after its recording and six years after Gaye's untimely death, the song was reissued on The Marvin Gaye Collection. It also appeared as a bonus track on a later reissue of the compilation A Motown Christmas. Hairston would recall he received a royalty check from the song a few years later after the album's release. Later evaluation of the song by critics labeled it as a "masterpiece". Ever since 1990, especially during the Iraq War, Gaye's song has been played on R&B radio stations during the Christmas season. The song was featured on the 2019 release of the posthumous Gaye album You’re The Man.

Credits
All vocals by Marvin Gaye
Instruments by The Funk Brothers and Marvin Gaye
Written by Forest Hairston and Marvin Gaye
Produced and arranged by Marvin Gaye

Charts

References

1972 songs
Marvin Gaye songs
Songs written by Marvin Gaye
American Christmas songs
Songs of the Vietnam War
Song recordings produced by Marvin Gaye